Ambahatrazo is a town and commune in Madagascar. It belongs to the district of Manakara Atsimo, which is a part of Vatovavy-Fitovinany Region. The population of the commune was estimated to be approximately 10,000 in 2001 commune census.

Only primary schooling is available. The vast majority (90%) of the population of the commune are farmers, while an additional 5% make their livelihood by raising livestock. The most important crop is rice, while other important products are lychee and cassava. The remaining 5% of the population are employed in service industries.

References and notes 

Populated places in Fitovinany